Corallus ruschenbergerii, commonly known as the Central American tree boa, common tree boa, and Trinidad tree boa, is a boa species found in lower Central America and northern South America. No subspecies are currently recognized. Like all boas, it is not venomous.

Etymology
The specific name, ruschenbergerii, is in honor of William Ruschenberger, who was a United States Navy surgeon.

Description
The colors are typically shades of yellow, brown or gray, although populations on Trinidad and Tobago are often a patternless pure bronze.

Geographic range
Corallus ruschenbergerii is found in Lower Central America in southwestern Costa Rica (south of 10° N) and Panama, including Isla del Rey, Isla Contadora, Isla de Cébaco and Isla Suscantupu. In South America it occurs in Colombia east of the Andes, north of the Cordillera Central and north of the Cordillera Oriental, northern Venezuela north of the Cordillera de Mérida and in the drainage of the Río Orinoco, north and west of the Guiana Shield, east of the Orinoco Delta. It is also found on Isla Margarita, Trinidad and Tobago. The type locality given is "Panama".

Habitat
It is nocturnal.

Feeding
The primary diet of C. ruschenbergerii consists of rodents and other small mammals, as well as lizards, frogs, birds and bats.

Captivity
Still fairly rare in captivity, C. ruschenbergerii is only recently becoming more common in the United States.

References

Further reading

Cope ED (1875). "On the Batrachia and Reptilia of Costa Rica". J. Acad. Nat. Sci. Philadelphia, Second Series 8: 93-154. (Xiphosoma ruschenbergerii, new species, p. 129).
Henderson RW (1997). "A Taxonomic Review of the Corallus hortulanus Complex of Neotropical Tree Boas". Caribbean J. Sci. 33 (3-4): 198-221.

ruschenbergerii
Snakes of Central America
Snakes of South America
Snakes of the Caribbean
Reptiles of Colombia
Reptiles of Costa Rica
Reptiles of Panama
Reptiles of Trinidad and Tobago
Reptiles of Venezuela
Reptiles described in 1875
Taxa named by Edward Drinker Cope